Damon Sharpe, born Damon Jared Reinagle, is an American record producer, songwriter, DJ and recording artist who works in Los Angeles. He first reached notability as a member of Guys Next Door.  He has since contributed to various albums that have cumulatively sold over 40 million copies and have been streamed over 2 billion times.  He has over 80 million streams as a solo artist and 800k monthly streams on Spotify.

Current career
Sharpe is active in Los Angeles. He is signed to Armada Music and has worked with various contemporary artists such as Jennifer Lopez, Ariana Grande, Pitbull, Alesso, Kylie Minogue, Anastacia, Kelly Rowland of Destiny's Child, Flo Rida, New Boyz, Monica, Charlie Wilson, NKOTB, Nelly, A1, Ginuwine, Amerie, 98 Degrees, American Idol's Kimberley Locke and Justin Guarini, Natalie Cole, Corbin Bleu, Korean and Japanese artists Got7, 2PM, SF9, BoA, SHINee, Da-ice, Kangta, Laboum, Kim Jae-joong, Ai, W-inds, T-ara, Kumi Koda, B1A4, Fairies and others. He has collaborated with EDM DJs Alesso, Thomas Gold, DVBBS, Morgan Page, Zonderling, Gattuso, Elephante, Kap Slap, Mischa Daniels, and Ferry Corsten. In 2005 he released the Hurricane Katrina relief record Come Together Now written with actress Sharon Stone and featuring contributions from Celine Dion, Nick Carter, Joss Stone, Jesse McCartney, Patti LaBelle, Wyclef Jean, Gavin DeGraw, Anthony Hamilton, The Game, JoJo, John Legend, Kimberley Locke, Natalie Cole, Brian McKnight, AJ McLean, Mýa, Aaron Carter, Stacie Orrico, Kelly Price, and Ruben Studdard. Other releases include works by Boyz II Men, 98 Degrees, JLS, Leona Lewis, Big Time Rush, and more. He also appeared on season 2 of The X Factor as one of the on camera vocal coaches.

Sharpe appeared as a coach/judge on the YTV spinoff series The Next Star: SuperGroup that aired spring 2014.

In 2022, Sharpe launched his own record electronic/dance record label entitled Brainjack Music.  The same year, he also performed his second DJ set at Electric Daisy Carnival in Las Vegas.

Discography

References

External links
Interview, HitQuarters Mar 2003
Interview, Authority Magazine Jul 2020
Article, LAWEEKLY Mar 2021
Interview, FLAUNT Aug 2021

Year of birth missing (living people)
Living people
Songwriters from California